Matt Henderson (born June 22, 1974) is an American retired professional ice hockey player. He played in six National Hockey League games with the Nashville Predators and Chicago Blackhawks.

Awards and honors

References

External links

1974 births
American men's ice hockey left wingers
Chicago Blackhawks players
Ice hockey players from Minnesota
Sportspeople from White Bear Lake, Minnesota
Iserlohn Roosters players
Living people
Milwaukee Admirals players
Nashville Predators players
Norfolk Admirals players
Philadelphia Phantoms players
St. Paul Vulcans players
Trenton Titans players
North Dakota Fighting Hawks men's ice hockey players
Undrafted National Hockey League players
NCAA men's ice hockey national champions